Cryptasterina is a genus of starfish belonging to the family Asterinidae. They occur in the Indian and Western Pacific Oceans.

The genus shows both viviparity and oviparity. The latter is the ancestral mode of reproduction.

Species
There are three species:

References

Asterinidae
Asteroidea genera